Mandoli is a census town in Shahdara district in the Indian territory of Delhi.

References

Cities and towns in North East Delhi district